Steinbacher is a German surname. Notable people with the surname include:

Arabella Steinbacher (born 1981), German violinist
Joachim Steinbacher (1911-2005), German ornithologist
Hank Steinbacher (1913–1977), American baseball player
Derek Steinbacher (born 1974), American craniomaxillofacial plastic and rhinoplasty surgeon

German-language surnames